Reicheella is a genus of flowering plants belonging to the family Caryophyllaceae. It has a synonym of Bryopsis , and only contains one known species, Reicheella andicola (Phil.) Pax 

Its native range is northern Chile.
 
The genus name of Reicheella is in honour of Karl Friedrich Reiche (1860–1929), a German botanist who worked as a university professor in Chile and Mexico. The Latin specific epithet of andicola is a compound word; with 'Andi-' meaning the Andes and also the Latin cola for "dweller" (from colere "to dwell"). It was first described and published in H.G.A.Engler & K.A.E.Prantl, Nat. Pflanzenfam., Nachtr. Vol.2 on page 21 in 1900.

References

Caryophyllaceae
Caryophyllaceae genera
Plants described in 1900
Flora of northern Chile